Young Desire is the third studio album by the Finnish band Lapko. It was released in 2007 and is a theme album which, as the title suggests, deals with the passion of youth.

Track listing 
 "This Is Aggressive Melancholy"
 "Young Desire"
 "Miami Vicer "
 "Sawyer the Brother"
 "Hugging the Phone"
 "Dead Disco"
 "Killer Whales "
 "Bad Boy"
 "Not Your Son"
 "Paranoid"
 "Funerals and Parties"

Personnel

Band
Ville Malja – vocals, electric guitar
Anssi Nordberg – bass guitar
Janne Heikkonen – drum kit

Other 
Karo Broman – producer

References

2007 albums
Lapko albums